The 2017 Formula 4 United States Championship season was the second season of the United States Formula 4 Championship, a motor racing series regulated according to FIA Formula 4 regulations and sanctioned by SCCA Pro Racing, the professional racing division of the Sports Car Club of America. It began on 8 April at Homestead-Miami Speedway and finished on 22 October at the Circuit of the Americas, after seven triple header rounds.

Teams and drivers
All teams were American-registered.

Race calendar

Championship standings
Points were awarded to the top 10 classified finishers in each race.

Drivers' standings

Teams' championship

References

External links 
 

United States
United States F4 Championship seasons
F4 United States Championship
United States F4